The 2006 Winmau World Masters was a darts tournament held at Leisure World in Bridlington between October 13-15, 2006. It also featured a qualifying event for the 2007 Lakeside World Professional Championship.

Seventeen-year-old Michael van Gerwen became the youngest winner in the 32-year history of the event when he defeated England captain Martin Adams in the final.

Tournament Schedule
Thursday October 12, 2006

Qualifying event for the 2007 Lakeside World Professional Championship was held.

Friday October 13, 2006

Players from 30 countries played on a multi-board system to qualify for the stage matches to be played on Saturday and Sunday. There were some major upsets in the qualifying round as only 4 seeded players managed to progress to the last 16. Five seeded players even failed to reach the final qualifying round (last 32) of the tournament. World Champion, Jelle Klaasen was amongst the big-named players who went out early.

Mervyn King (5) lost to Albertino Essers 2-3
Vincent van der Voort (8) lost to Rick Hofstra 2-3
Mike Veitch (10) lost to Joe Palmer 1-3
Jelle Klaasen (13) lost to Mario Robbe 0-3
Paul Hanvidge (15) lost to Roy Montgomery 1-3

Bobby George lost in the first qualifying round to Jim Widmeyer (USA). Former World Champion, Andy Fordham managed to progress through one qualifying round before losing to Benny Grace (Ire).

Saturday October 14, 2006
0900 Girls Final (Best of 5 Legs)

Kimberley Lewis  (Ave 63.06) beat Thea Kaaijk  (Ave 67.26) 4-2 (legs)

0930 Boys Final (Best of 5 Legs) Maarten Pape (Ned) Jan Dekker (Ned) v

Maarten Pape  (Ave 75.84) beat  Jan Dekker   (Ave 71.64) 4-1 (legs)

1000 - 1640 Men's Championship Last 16 & Quarter-finals played
 
Sunday October 15, 2006
1130 - 1230 Women's Championship Semi-finals and final played
1330 Men's Championship Semi-finals & final played

2006 Men's Event results
Each set is best of 3 legs.

2006 Women's Event results

See also
 Winmau World Masters - history of the event

World Masters
World Masters (darts)
Bridlington
2000s in the East Riding of Yorkshire